Pooja Vastrakar (born 25 September 1999) is an Indian cricketer who currently plays for Madhya Pradesh and India. An all-rounder, she plays as a right-arm medium-fast bowler and right-handed batter.  She made her international debut for India in 2018, against South Africa.

Early life 
Vastrakar initially started playing cricket with the boys near her neighborhood in Shahdol, Madhya Pradesh. She later started going to the stadium and practiced net batting where the coach Ashutosh Shrivastava realized her talent and started her formal training. She started off as a batter and later on when she joined the Madhya Pradesh team, she started fast bowling alongside her batting. At the age of 15, she was a part of India Green Women Squad. In 2016, while Vastrakar was fielding during a senior women's domestic match, she twisted her knee. This led to her getting surgery done for her anterior cruciate ligament tear which put her National call-up in jeopardy. The Challenger Trophy in 2018 played a pivotal role in Vastrakar's selection for India's South Africa tour.

Vastrakar's father is a retired employee of Bharat Sanchar Nigam Limited (BSNL). Her mother died when she was ten years old. She has four sisters and two brothers and is the youngest of seven siblings.

International career
She made her Women's One Day International cricket (WODI) debut for India Women against South Africa Women on 10 February 2018. She made her Women's Twenty20 International cricket (WT20I) debut for India Women against South Africa Women on 13 February 2018.

In October 2018, she was named in India's squad for the 2018 ICC Women's World Twenty20 tournament in the West Indies. However, she suffered an injury during a warm-up match, and was later ruled out of the tournament. In January 2020, she was named in India's squad for the 2020 ICC Women's T20 World Cup in Australia.

In May 2021, she was named in India's Test squad for their one-off match against the England women's cricket team. Vastrakar made her Test debut on 16 June 2021, for India against England. In January 2022, she was named in India's team for the 2022 Women's Cricket World Cup in New Zealand. She scored 156 runs averaging 26.00, and took 10 wickets averaging 18.30 in the tournament. In July 2022, she was named in India's team for the cricket tournament at the 2022 Commonwealth Games in Birmingham, England.

References

External links
 
 

1999 births
Living people
People from Shahdol
Cricketers from Madhya Pradesh
India women Test cricketers
India women One Day International cricketers
India women Twenty20 International cricketers
Madhya Pradesh women cricketers
Central Zone women cricketers
IPL Supernovas cricketers
Mumbai Indians (WPL) cricketers
Brisbane Heat (WBBL) cricketers
Cricketers at the 2022 Commonwealth Games
Commonwealth Games silver medallists for India
Commonwealth Games medallists in cricket
Medallists at the 2022 Commonwealth Games